The Miss Turkey 2018 held on September 24, 2017 in the Volkswagen Arena Istanbul in Istanbul, Turkey was hosted by Dilay Korkmaz. On the coronation Night 3 major winners were crowned as  Miss World Turkey 2018,  Miss Universe Turkey 2018 and Miss Supranational Turkey 2018.

At the event, Aslı Sümen crowned her successor Şevval Şahin as Miss World Turkey 2018, Pınar Tartan crowned her successor Tara de Vries as Miss Universe Turkey 2018 for the first time in Miss Turkey and Yasemin Çoklar  Crowned her successor Roda Irmak Kalkan as Miss Supranational Turkey 2018 .

Winner and runners-up

Contestants
The official Top 20 Candidates of Miss Turkey 2017:

References

2018 in Turkey
2018 beauty pageants
Beauty pageants in Turkey
Annual events in Turkey